Diplulmaris antarctica is a species of Antarctic jellyfish in the family Ulmaridae.

Description

Diplulmaris antarctica has 16 - 48 laterally compressed, white tentacles and a white frontal lobe. It has reddish-orange stomach gastrodermis and frilled oral arms of the same colour.

This jellyfish is normally infested with Hyperiella dilatata. These hyperiid amphipods appear as white dots on the surface of the bell, and do not appear to eat the medusa.

Diet
Diplulmaris antarctica feeds on copepods, euphausiid larvate, medusae, ctenophore, fish larvae, and molluscan pteropods such as Clione antarctica and Limacina antarctica.

Distribution
This species is found in Antarctica including the Antarctic Peninsula in continental shelf waters near the surface.

References

Further reading
Pelagic Scyphomedusae (Scyphozoa: Coronatae and Semaeostomeae) of the Southern Ocean. RJ Larson. Washington, DC: American Geophysical Union, 1986
Antarctic Ecology, Volume 1. MW Holdgate, ed. NY: Academic Press, 1970. pp244–258
Annales de l'Institut Oceanographique 73(2):139-158, 1997; 5: Annales de l'Institut Oceanographique 73(2):123-124, 1997

Ulmaridae
Animals described in 1908